Rajendra Chaudhary may refer to:
Rajendra Chaudhary (Rajasthan politician) (born 1955)
Rajendra Chaudhary (Uttar Pradesh politician) (born 1956)